The Tattered Dress is a 1957 American CinemaScope film noir crime film released by Universal Pictures  and directed by Jack Arnold. It stars Jeff Chandler, Jeanne Crain, Jack Carson, Gail Russell and Elaine Stewart.

Plot

In a California resort community, the wealthy Michael Reston is charged with the murder of a man he claimed attacked his wife, Charleen.

Reston hires a high-priced lawyer, James Gordon Blane, a man known to do anything it takes to win a case. Blane makes few friends in the community because the victim was a popular figure while the Restons are not popular with anyone. But his skillful cross-examination of a sheriff, Nick Hoak, results in Blane's client being found not guilty.

Hoak decides to get even. He fabricates evidence that Blane bribed a woman on the jury by pressuring her to perjure herself. Now it is Blane who goes on trial, with only his estranged wife, Diane, and his friend, Billy, coming to his aid. While defending himself, Blane begins to feel remorse over having won acquittals for so many guilty clients.

Blane ultimately is found not guilty due to the obvious possibility that the sheriff framed him in retaliation for his successful defense of Reston. The juror, Carol Morrow, who only lied about the bribery because she was romantically involved with the sheriff, becomes distraught when he rejects her out of fear his manipulation will be discovered. Enraged by the acquittal, the sheriff watches Blane going down the Court-House steps.  Standing in the shadows he draws his gun intent on murdering Blane in cold blood.  He is stopped when Morrow gets some revenge of her own by shooting him.  As she is arrested for her actions, the Blanes reconcile and leave town for good.

Cast
 Jeff Chandler as James Blane
 Jeanne Crain as Diane Blane
 Jack Carson as Sheriff Hoak
 Gail Russell as Carol Morrow
 Elaine Stewart as Charleen Reston
 George Tobias as Billy Giles
 Edward Andrews as Lester Rawlings
 Phillip Reed as Michael Reston
 Edward Platt as Ralph Adams - Reporter (as Edward C. Platt)
 Paul Birch as Prosecutor Frank Mitchell 
 Alexander Lockwood as Paul Vernon
 Edwin Jerome as Judge David L. Johnson
 William Schallert as Court Clerk
 June McCall as Girl at Slot Machine 
 Frank J. Scannell as Cal Morrison - Blackjack Dealer (as Frank Scannell)
 Floyd Simmons as Larry Bell
 Ziva Rodann as Woman on Train (as Ziva Shapir)
 Marina Orschel as Girl by Pool
 Ingrid Goude as Girl by Pool

Production
Chandler's casting was announced in June 1956. Zugsmith later recalled Chandler "was becoming a bit difficult and he was their (Universal's) second biggest star at the time. I guess one of the reasons was he was their biggest, and then Rock Hudson came along!"

Filming started on August 13, 1956. Shooting took place in Palm Springs.

Reception
The Los Angeles Times said that Chandler "does the best acting job of his career" in the film.

See also
 List of American films of 1957

References

External links

 
 
 
 
 
Review of film at Variety

1957 films
1957 crime drama films
Universal Pictures films
CinemaScope films
American crime drama films
American black-and-white films
American courtroom films
1950s English-language films
Film noir
Films scored by Frank Skinner
1950s American films